Japanese South Korean or North South Japanese may refer to:

Japan-South Korea relations
Japanese people in South Korea
South Koreans in Japan

See also
Mindan, the pro-South Korean ethnic representative organisation for Koreans in Japan
Zainichi Korean language, the dialect of Korean spoken in Japan